Czyprki may refer to the following places:
Czyprki, Bartoszyce County in Warmian-Masurian Voivodeship (north Poland)
Czyprki, Ełk County in Warmian-Masurian Voivodeship (north Poland)
Czyprki, Giżycko County in Warmian-Masurian Voivodeship (north Poland)